This is a list of United States wireless communications service providers. The Cellular Telecommunications & Internet Association (CTIA), lists approximately 30 facilities-based wireless service providers in the United States as members. Competitive Carriers Association (CCA) has over 100 members. Aside from the facilities-based providers, there are over 50 virtual operators that use the top four networks to provide service.

Largest U.S. wireless providers

The big four wireless telecommunications facilities-based service providers by subscriber count in the United States are:

 Verizon: 142.8 million (Q2 2022)
 T-Mobile US: 110.0 million (Q2 2022)
 AT&T Mobility: 101.8 million (Q2 2022)
 Dish Wireless: 7.98 million (Q4 2022)

Each active SIM card is considered a subscriber. Wholesale customers include users of machine to machine networks and mobile virtual network operators that operate on the host network, but are managed by wholesale partners. The counts above were taken from each provider's quarterly reports. Starting with Q2 2020, the three top carriers no longer report wholesale subscriber count. AT&T also does not include "connected devices" count, however it is not known if Verizon or T-Mobile include these devices. As such, it is possible that the ranking above could be inaccurate.

Technologies used
The top 3 wireless providers have all standardized on 4G LTE and 5G NR as their wireless communication standards. Of which, LTE has been deployed across their entire coverage area; however, the LTE bands used by each provider remain largely incompatible. Some wireless providers also maintain legacy networks; of these, T-Mobile uses GSM, while UScellular uses CDMA2000. However, T-Mobile has reduced spectrum allocated for GSM and uses the network mostly for nomadic and non-mobile GSM services. While UScellular is gradually phasing out EV-DO area by area.

All carriers have enabled VoLTE on their networks. Verizon introduced their first LTE-only phone, LG Exalt LTE, in June 2017. Verizon, AT&T, T-Mobile, and UScellular also sell SIM cards through their retail channels, both in-store and online.

The top 3 wireless providers operate nationwide wireless networks which cover most of the population in the United States, while UScellular and other smaller carriers provide native network coverage across selected regions of the United States while supplementing nationwide coverage through roaming agreements with other carriers.

Facilities-based service providers

The following tables lists service providers that own and manage their network equipment and facilities. Unless specified otherwise the subscriber count includes subscribers on the virtual networks hosted.

Contiguous US and Hawaii

Alaska

Puerto Rico and U.S. Virgin Islands

Guam and Northern Mariana Islands

American Samoa

Defunct, merged and acquired operators

Some operators listed below may still function as a separate brand but they no longer own any infrastructure (towers, network, etc.).

See also
List of United States mobile virtual network operators
List of CDMA2000 networks
List of UMTS networks
List of LTE networks
List of mobile network operators
List of mobile network operators of the Americas
List of mobile network operators of the Asia Pacific region

References

Wireless
United States

United States
United States
Wireless